Nobody Else but You may refer to:
Nobody Else but You (film), a 2011 French comedy crime mystery by Gérald Hustache-Mathieu
"Nobody Else but You" (Trey Songz song), a 2017 single from Tremaine the Album
"Nobody Else but Me", a 1946 song by Jerome Kern and Oscar Hammerstein II
"Nobody Else but You", a song by Bette Midler on the 2000 album Bette

See also
Nobody Else but Me (album), a 1994 studio album by Stan Getz